Emily Young is a British film director and screenwriter who is currently also teaching screenwriting and directing at the London Film School.

Early life
Young was born in Islington, London, the daughter of Helen Young (née Mason) and Hugo Young. Both her parents were journalists and her mother was also a children's book author.

Career 
After graduating from the Polish National Film School in Łódź, Young won the Cinefondation prize at the Cannes Film Festival for her graduation film, 'Second Hand'. Her first feature film, 'Kiss of Life' (2004) won a BAFTA award (the Carl Forman prize for best debut film). 
In 2009 Young directed Veronika Decides to Die in New York City. The film is based on the novel Veronika Decides to Die written by Paulo Coelho and stars Sarah Michelle Gellar, and David Thewlis. Young is currently developing an adaptation of the novel, 'White' by Marie Darrieussecq with Film Four.

Education
Young studied English Literature at the University of Edinburgh where she was awarded a First Class MA degree. She then learned Polish and trained as a film director at the National Film School in Łódź. In 2000 she was awarded a residency in Paris by the Festival de Cannes to develop a feature film of the memoir, 'Once in a House on Fire' by Andrea Ashworth.

Filmography
 Ziemia na górze (1996)
 Second Hand (1999)
 Kiss of Life (2003)
 Veronika Decides to Die (2009)

Awards and nominations
 BAFTA Award Carl Foreman Award for Best Newcomer (2004): Kiss of Life 
 Cannes Film Festival Cinefondation Award (1999): Second Hand

Nominations:
 British Independent Film Awards Douglas Hiscox Award (2004): Kiss of Life
 Copenhagen International Film Festival Golden Swan Award (2003): Kiss of Life
 Dinard Festival of British Cinema Golden Hitchcock (2003): Kiss of Life

External links

Emily Young interview, BBC, December 2003

1970 births
Living people
English film directors
English screenwriters
Outstanding Debut by a British Writer, Director or Producer BAFTA Award winners